Nardine Garas (born 19 December 2003 in Cairo), also known as Nardine Sameh Garas, is an Egyptian professional squash player. As of August 2022, she was ranked number 78 in the world.

References

2003 births
Living people
Egyptian female squash players